Haxo is a surname. Notable people with the surname include: 

Nicolas Haxo (1749–1794), French general
François Nicolas Benoît, Baron Haxo (1774–1838), French Army general and military engineer

See also
Haxo (Paris Métro)

French-language surnames